Gary Grigsby's War Between the States is a 2008 computer wargame developed by 2 by 3 Games and published by Matrix Games. It simulates the conflict between the Union and the Confederacy during the American Civil War.

Development
War Between the States was released on June 12, 2008.

Reception
According to Joel Billings of 2 by 3 Games, War Between the States was "not a financial success for us". He attributed its performance to competition from rival wargames set during the American Civil War, which had launched not long before War Between the States. It received a "bronze" prize in Usenet's "War-Historical Wargame of the Year" award category.

References

External links
Official page (archived)

2008 video games
American Civil War video games
Computer wargames
Turn-based strategy video games
Video games developed in the United States
Windows games
Windows-only games
Matrix Games games
Multiplayer and single-player video games